Helena Maria Lucy Swanwick CH (née Sickert; 30 January 1864 – 16 November 1939) was a British feminist and pacifist. Her autobiography, I Have Been Young (1935), gives a remarkable account of the non-militant women's suffrage campaign in the UK and of anti-war campaigning during the First World War, together with philosophical discussions of non-violence.

Swanwick's name and picture, along with 58 other women's suffrage supporters, are on the plinth of the statue of Millicent Fawcett in Parliament Square, London, unveiled in April 2018.

Early life and education
Born in Munich, Swanwick was the only daughter of Eleanor Louisa Henry and the Danish painter Oswald Sickert. Swanwick's brother was the painter Walter Sickert. Her maternal grandmother was an Irish dancer who became pregnant by the astronomer Richard Sheepshanks, a Fellow of Trinity College, Cambridge.

Reading John Stuart Mill's The Subjection of Women (1869) influenced Swanwick to become a feminist. She was educated at Girton College, Cambridge, then appointed lecturer in psychology at Westfield College in 1885. She married the Manchester University lecturer Frederick Swanwick in 1888.

Career
Swanwick worked as a journalist, initially as a sort of protégée of C. P. Scott, and wrote articles for the Manchester Guardian. In 1906 she joined the National Union of Women's Suffrage Societies (NUWSS) in preference to the Women's Social and Political Union (the suffragettes), because of her belief in non-violence. Quickly becoming prominent within the NUWSS, she served as editor of its weekly journal, The Common Cause, from 1909 to 1912. Despite her pacifist views, she wrote to the Manchester Guardian in November 1910, on behalf of the NUWSS, in defence of the suffragettes arrested during the Battle of Downing Street. While regretting the suffragettes' violence, she blamed the confrontation on Prime Minister H. H. Asquith's "continual evasions" on the matter of women's suffrage, calling him a "past-master in evasion". She remained on the NUWSS Executive until 1915. She was also a member of the Labour Party.

On the outbreak of World War I, Swanwick began campaigning for a negotiated peace. From 1914 she was active in the Union of Democratic Control. In 1915, together with such other prominent suffragists as Catherine Marshall and Agnes Maude Royden, she resigned from the NUWSS over its refusal to send delegates to the International Women's Congress at the Hague. She was one of the founding members of the Women's International League for Peace and Freedom.

G. K. Chesterton criticised her pacifism in the 2 September 1916 issue of Illustrated London News: "Mrs. Swanwick ... has recently declared that there must be no punishment for the responsible Prussian. She puts it specifically on the ground that they were promised, or promised themselves, the conquest of the whole world; and they have not got it. This, she says, will be punishment enough. If I were to propose, to the group which is supposed to inspire the Pacifist propaganda, that a man who burgled their strong boxes or pilfered their petty cash should suffer no punishment beyond failing to get the money, they would very logically ask me if I was an Anarchist."

Post-war work and death
After the war she maintained her internationalist views, opposing the punitive terms of the Treaty of Versailles and serving as the United Kingdom substitute delegate to the League of Nations. Appointed to the Order of the Companions of Honour in the New Years' Honours of 1931, she became increasingly depressed throughout the 1930s by the growing attitude of preparedness towards fascist violence, a depression that deepened after the death of her husband in 1934. In November 1939, following the outbreak of the Second World War, she committed suicide with an overdose of veronal at her home in Maidenhead, Berkshire.

Selected works
The Future of the Women's Movement (1913)
Builders of Peace, Being Ten Years History of the Union of Democratic Control (1924)
Labour's foreign policy : what has been and what might be (1929)
 I Have Been Young, autobiography, (1935).
The Roots of Peace: A Sequel to Collective Insecurity, Being an Essay on Some of the Uses, Condition (1938)

See also
 List of peace activists

References

Notes

External links
 Helena Swanwick at www.spartacus-educational.com
 Mrs. Swanwick on Women, Dora Montefiore (1921)
 The Suffragist and the 'Average Woman' Sandra Stanley Holton, University of Adelaide
 

1864 births
1939 deaths
Alumni of Girton College, Cambridge
English feminists
English suffragists
Pacifist feminists
Members of the Order of the Companions of Honour
People educated at Notting Hill & Ealing High School
British anti–World War I activists
Women's International League for Peace and Freedom people
German emigrants to England
Naturalised citizens of the United Kingdom
People from Munich
1939 suicides